Rogue City is a 2020 French crime film directed and written by Olivier Marchal and starring Lannick Gautry, Stanislas Merhar, David Belle and Kaaris. It was released on Netflix on 30 October 2020. Set in Marseille, it is about an anti-gang police unit that is investigating a mass shooting at a nightclub, amidst tension from an internal affairs investigation for their unorthodox methods, friction with the rival narcotics unit, rumors of corruption, and threats from gang leaders.

Plot
When a heavily-armed Marseille anti-gang squad escorts gang patriarch Paul Maranzano between prisons, he asks to  visit his wife in the hospital, who has terminal cancer. At her request, he suffocates her with a pillow to end her suffering.

A gang does a mass shooting at a nightclub party, targetting a rival gang, killing nine attendees. One of the attacking gang members, Rizzo, is knocked down by gunfire (stopped by his bulletproof vest), and cannot escape in the getaway car. He hides his machine gun and bulletproof vest in a dumpster and blends in with the victims. Given his gang connections, he is brought in to the police station for questioning. During Detective Costa's interview with Rizzo, he fakes a fight, murders him and plants his service gun in Rizzo's hand.

Detective Willy Kapellian, whose marriage is failing, is regularly drinking excessively. One night, he gets drunk and drives away with a female officer, only to get shot at by gang members (he does not see their identity). It is police protocol to take a blood sample after a shooting incident. Fearing that Will will lose his job, Captain Richard Vronski volunteers to take the blood test in his place. When the new Police Chief learns of Vronski's action, he suspends him.

The police anti-gang unit use confiscated gang guns to do an unsanctioned ambush of drug gang that is doing a major drug shipment and sale of cocaine. Unbeknownst to the anti-gang unit, an undercover narcotics agent was embedded in the drug gang, and he is killed in the ambush. The police take and hide the drugs and money. After incriminating evidence is found against Will, implicating him in the ambush, he kills himself. The film ends with the anti-gang unit's members being murdered one by one by a drug gang's hitmen.

Cast

Production 
The film was announced in May 2019, with Jean Reno, Lannick Gautry, Stanislas Merhar, and David Belle joining the cast. Filming took place that September in the south of France.

Release 
Rogue City was digitally released by Netflix on October 30, 2020. In its debut weekend, it was the second most-streamed film on the site.

Critical response 
Elisabeth Vincentelli of The New York Times acknowledges that "Marchal’s movie [is] radical in its nihilism", as it depicts a "bleak vision" of "corruption [as] pervasive" and inescapable. Despite 
this positive comment, she says that overall, the film is an "ineffectual muddle", noting that "[v]iolent, law-defying cops would be a tough sell at any time, but Rogue City is oblivious to the changed context" on dirty cops, who "don't hold much romantic allure nowadays."

John Serba from Decider gave the film a negative review, calling it a "muddy and grim", "two-hour slog".
While he praised the lighting on this "[i]nstant cop thriller", he lost patience with its "cast of relentless scowlers, ever-shifting loyalties, lack of any real characters and general cynicism for the state of the human soul".

Reviewer Roger Moore calls it "[c]onvoluted, bloody and downbeat" and says that the film has "so many characters, intrigues and competing agendas" that it is "hard to follow". Moore says that characters other than Vronski are "barely sketched in" and he states that "writer-director Marchal loses track of characters, story threads, mob cash and drugs, impatient as he is to get to the next shoot out."

References

External links
 
 
 

2020 films
2020 action films
2020 crime films
2020s French films
2020s French-language films
French action films
Films directed by Olivier Marchal
French-language Netflix original films
Films set in Marseille